Kalles may refer to:
 Kalles Kaviar, a brand of Swedish caviar
 Kalles (Bithynia), a town of ancient Bithynia
 Kalles (river), a river of Asia Minor